Brdo is a small settlement in the Municipality of Tržič in the Upper Carniola region of Slovenia.

Name
Brdo was attested in written sources as Ekk  1420 and Nawarde in 1498.

References

External links 

Brdo at Geopedia

Populated places in the Municipality of Tržič